Projectograph was a Hungarian film distribution company established in 1908 by Mór Ungerleider and József Neumann. They had originally been cafe owners before switching into the more lucrative business of film screening and distribution. During the first few years of the company's existence during the Silent era Projectograph came to dominate the Hungarian market. While they distributed some Hungarian films made by leading companies such as Corvin Film, they mostly dealt with the distribution of foreign films. Their principal rival was the French Pathé company which was a leading distribution outfit in Central and Eastern Europe. The company's founders both diversified into film production, founding separate companies.

References

Bibliography
 Cunningham, John. Hungarian Cinema: From Coffee House to Multiplex. Wallflower Press, 2004.

Entertainment companies of Hungary
Film distributors
Film organisations in Hungary
Distribution companies of Hungary
Entertainment companies established in 1908
1908 establishments in Hungary